is a pseudonymous Japanese manga artist. Regarded as the most influential creator in the gay manga genre, he has produced over 20 books in four languages over the course of his nearly four decade-long career. Tagame began contributing manga and prose fiction to Japanese gay men's magazines in the 1980s, after making his debut as a manga artist in the yaoi (male-male romance) manga magazine June while in high school. As a student he studied graphic design at Tama Art University, and worked as a commercial graphic designer and art director to support his career as a manga artist. His manga series , originally serialized in the gay men's magazine Badi from 1992 to 1993, enjoyed breakout success after it was published as a book in 1994. After co-founding the gay men's magazine G-men in 1995, Tagame began working as a gay manga artist full-time.

For much of his career Tagame exclusively created erotic and pornographic manga, works that are distinguished by their graphic depictions of sadomasochism, sexual violence, and hypermasculinity. Beginning in the 2010s, Tagame gained mainstream recognition after he began to produce non-pornographic manga depicting LGBT themes and subject material; his 2014 manga series My Brother's Husband, his first series aimed at a general audience, received widespread critical acclaim and was awarded a Japan Media Arts Festival Prize, a Japan Cartoonists Association Award, and an Eisner Award. Tagame is further noted for his contributions as an art historian, through his multi-volume art anthology series Gay Erotic Art in Japan.

Biography

Early life and career
Tagame was born in Kamakura on February 3, 1964, into a family distantly descended from samurai. The youngest of two brothers, Tagame was forbidden from reading manga as a child with the exception of the works of Osamu Tezuka, which his parents believed had literary merit. He became exposed to a broader array of manga by reading shōnen (boys' comics) stories in barber shop waiting rooms, notably the works of horror authors Kazuo Umezu and Go Nagai, whose manga often featured violent and sexual themes. He began drawing as a child, and by middle school was drawing amateur comics for his classmates and teachers. In his early teens he began drawing pornographic manga after reading novels by the Marquis de Sade and discovering the magazine Renaissance, which re-printed material from underground BDSM manga zines; Tagame has remarked that he discovered his interest in BDSM before he realized he was gay.

He became aware of his homosexuality after watching films featuring "naked and bound men" (such as the Italian Hercules series and Charlton Heston in Planet of the Apes) and discovering the gay men's magazine . He found that he was uninterested in stories in Sabu focused on romance, and drawn to stories that focused on sadomasochism. In high school Tagame began writing manga professionally, and contributed to the manga magazine June in 1982 under a pen name. June was a yaoi (male-male romance manga, also known as boys' love or BL) magazine that targeted a primarily female readership, and was noted for its avant-garde stories with complex plots and social realism; Tagame's first story in June focused on a "pretty boy who cross dresses" whose father is murdered by his boyfriend. Tagame struggled with his sexuality and interest in sadomasochism through high school, and did not come out until his freshman year of college.

Upon graduating high school Tagame moved to Tokyo to study graphic design at Tama Art University against the wishes of his parents, who expected him to attend the University of Tokyo and become a banker. Throughout college he submitted gay erotic stories, illustrations, and manga to Barazoku, René, and other gay and BL magazines under a variety of pseudonyms. He eventually settled on the pen name "Gengoroh Tagame"; both words are Japanese terms for different species of water bugs, which Tagame chose to differentiate himself from the "macho or romantic" pen names used by other gay Japanese artists. While on a student art tour of Europe, Tagame discovered the American leather magazine Drummer at a bookshop in London. The magazine featured homoerotic and fetishistic illustrations by western artists such as Tom of Finland, Rex, and Bill Ward, and would heavily influence Tagame's art. After graduating university he began to work as a commercial graphic designer and later art director, while continuing to write manga and prose fiction.

Gay erotic manga
The 1980s saw an increase in the popularity of gay media in Japan, a trend inspired by the cultural importation of works by American gay artists such as Robert Mapplethorpe and Edmund White. As Japanese publishers sought to exploit this new interest in gay art created by gay artists, Tagame emerged as an influential artist on the basis of his work at June, Barazoku, and other magazines. Tagame made his debut as a gay erotic manga artist in 1987, creating manga for Sabu. In contrast to the heterosexual and female-oriented yaoi and BL magazines that had published Tagame's previous works, Sabu was produced by gay men for a gay male audience. His manga series , originally serialized in the gay men's magazine Badi from 1992 to 1993, was published as a book in 1994 and became the first gay comic work in Japan to turn a profit. The breakout success of The Toyed Man demonstrated the viability of gay manga – manga about gay relationships for a gay male audience, in contrast to yaoi – as a commercial category, and established it as a genre "of cultural merit and artistic importance." Tagame's second longform series, the 824-page, three-volume historical epic , is noted by Graham Kolbeins as widening "the scope of what gay manga could be narratively" beyond stories focused largely on pornography to incorporate complex narrative and aesthetic elements.

In 1995, Tagame and two editors from Badi founded the gay men's magazine G-men, a shorthand for "Gengoroh's Men". The magazine focused on works depicting masculine, physically large men, and featured manga depicting older and muscular body types. G-men was part of a concerted effort by Tagame to "change the status quo of gay magazines" away from the aesthetic of bishōnen – delicate and androgynous boys and young men that were popular in gay media at the time. G-men was a success, and by 1996, Tagame was working full-time as a gay manga artist. The magazine serialized the bulk of Tagame's manga published during the 1990s and early 2000s, notably Do You Remember the South Island's POW Camp? and Pride. Tagame continued to publish his serialized manga as books during this period, initially through gay pornography production companies, and later through formal publishers. Beginning in 2003, Tagame began publishing the multi-volume gay erotic art anthology series Gay Erotic Art in Japan, which follows the history of Japanese gay erotic art from the 1950s to the present.

International and crossover success
Tagame attracted an international audience beginning in the 2000s though the circulation of pirated and scanlated versions of his works. His works began to receive officially-licensed translations in 2005, after French publisher H&O Editions released a translation of his manga series Gunji; an exhibition of his works was held in Paris in 2009. In 2012, an English-language translation of Tagame's one-shot manga Standing Ovations was published in Thickness, an erotic comics anthology published by Ryan Sands and Michael DeForge, marking the first release of an officially-licensed English-language translation of Tagame's manga. American publisher PictureBox published The Passion of Gengoroh Tagame, an English-language anthology of Tagame's manga, in 2013; several of Tagame's works were also translated into English by the now-defunct publishing house Bruno Gmünder Verlag.

In 2013, Tagame was approached by editors at the publishing company Futabasha about creating a manga series for general audiences. Though Tagame had previously been approached by mainstream manga magazines about creating a non-pornographic autobiographical manga series, he had declined the offers, stating that he "didn't want to abandon my style and my audience by writing a more mainstream work." Beginning in the early 2010s, Tagame noted that while same-sex marriage was rarely covered in the mainstream Japanese press, the issue generated significant interest among his heterosexual fans when he posted about the topic on his Twitter account. Subsequently, Tagame pitched Futabasha for a series about same-sex marriage and LGBT rights in Japan from the perspective of a straight character; the resulting series was My Brother's Husband, which was serialized in the seinen (manga for young adult men) magazine Monthly Action from 2014 to 2017. The series was widely acclaimed, won numerous awards, and was adapted into a live-action television drama that aired on NHK in 2018.

Tagame has continued to create erotic manga concurrently with all-ages manga, stating that the experience of creating My Brother's Husband made him "realize how much fun [all-ages manga] is to draw" and that balancing the creation of erotic works with the creation of all-ages works was "very healthy for me, mentally." Our Colors, his second series aimed at a general audience, was serialized in Monthly Action from 2018 to 2020.

Style and influences

Sex is typically the primary focus of Tagame's manga and his works are almost invariably fetishistic in nature, featuring depictions of bondage, discipline, leather, and sadomasochism. These themes are often amplified through his use of science fiction, fantasy, and historical fiction to create surreal and hyperreal sexual scenarios. Tagame has acknowledged that his manga "represents a very small minority of the world. In the real world, the large majority of people don't like torture in their sex lives, invariably. But I'm not writing for them." Tagame sparingly depicts extreme fetishistic material in work such as coprophilia or graphic violence, noting that the primary purpose of his pornographic works is to inspire sexual excitement and not disgust.

While comic art featuring sexualized depictions of masculine men is not unique to Tagame, academic William Armour argues that his works are distinguished from his peers through his interest "in the way in which power relationships between men can be eroticised." His manga have been noted for their aesthetic qualities and psychological complexity, with Armour writing that "while on one level Tagame presents stories as graphic cartoon porn, on another level he weaves into the images and wording a much deeper sense of how homosociality can easily transform into homosexuality, despite his male characters being positioned as examples of hegemonic masculinity." Tagame himself has stated that "what I have tried to do in my erotica is raise that to the level of art and think about it in terms of art being principally to the service of depicting humanity."

While the majority of gay manga artists produce works targeting a gay male audience exclusively, Tagame is noted for having a significant heterosexual and female audience. Tagame has stated that he adjusts his style if a work is being published in a format where it will be primarily read by a specific subset of his audience, noting that "when I write for gay men's magazines, it's primarily about the hero's initiative and interiority. When I know that women are also going to be reading it [...] they're more interested in seeing actual relationships and coupling." In considering why Tagame's works attract a diverse audience, Anne Ishii hypothesizes that "something about what Tagame does isn't even about being gay [...] it's about desire and the darker side of desire. It doesn't fit into a sexual category to me."

Tagame credits both Japanese and Western artists among his influences, including Caravaggio, Michelangelo, the Marquis de Sade, Tsukioka Yoshitoshi, Go Mishima, Sanshi Funayama, Oda Toshimi, Suehiro Maruo, Kazuichi Hanawa, Hiromi Hiraguchi, and Bill Ward. Nude figures in Hellenistic and Baroque art, initially encountered by Tagame in classic art anthologies he read as a child, heavily influenced his works. In considering his Western and Japanese influences, Tagame notes that Western Christian art has inspired his depictions of nudity and humiliation (such as Caravaggio's depictions of the crucifixion of Christ), whereas Japanese classical art such as shunga (woodcut erotic art originating in the Edo period) has inspired his depictions of violence.

Themes and motifs

Hypermasculinity
The majority of Tagame's works depict men with personal and physical traits associated with hypermasculinity – developed muscles, hirsute bodies, large penises, an exaggerated volume of ejaculate, machismo, and participation in extreme or violent sexual acts. Tagame has stated that he is interested in how men who are perceived as masculine "respond to societal pressure" and "perform their manliness beyond what's necessary," and how those attitudes change "if a man loses his manliness [...] by participating in activity that normative society believes men would not normally participate in." Armour identifies Pride, which depicts a dominant university student who is trained into submission by his masochistic professor, and The Gamefowl in Darkness, which is inspired by Yasujirō Ozu's A Hen in the Wind and Edogawa Ranpo's The Caterpillar, as representative examples of hypermasculine themes in Tagame's works.

Tagame's artwork is often associated with bara, a colloquialism used by non-Japanese audiences to refer to Japanese erotic art featuring masculine men. Tagame has rejected this association, citing the term's historical use as a pejorative for gay men and calling it "a very negative word that comes with bad connotations." Tagame's works are often categorized alongside the "macho" gay art movement associated with artists such as Tom of Finland, which emerged in American biker culture in the early 1960s and was later adapted by gay men to counter stereotypes of effeteness and emasculation. Designer Chip Kidd has contested this association, arguing that "as delightfully sturdy and game as Tom of Finland’s characters depicted, they never quite seem alive. Tagame’s characters are, by vivid contrast, almost unbearably so."

Edmund White argues that the hypermasculine ideal Tagame depicts is more categorically similar to Meiji period literature, specifically the character archetype of a man "who was homosexual because he was uncouth, not refined enough to be heterosexual and to please women, a warrior, a peasant from the south, not fit for decent society." Armour notes that Tagame's works are distinguished from his Western gay comic peers through his subversion of stereotypical portrayals of East Asian men as emasculated and asexual, writing that "while there seems little difference in how Tagame’s men are drawn and how male characters in Western erotic gay comics are depicted [...] from a white, Western viewpoint, Tagame's depiction of hyper-masculine Japanese men can be considered to break down the stereotype within many Western gay cultures that Asian men in general are skinny, small-dicked, effete weaklings who are fucked for the pleasure of big-dicked, buff macho white guy."

Sadomasochism and sexual violence
Though not all sexual depictions in Tagame's manga involve sadomasochism and sexual violence, it is a common theme in his work, with White writing that "in Gengoroh Tagame's world, no man is ever penetrated willingly." Tagame's BDSM-focused works often depict other taboo subject material, such as rape, bestiality, incest, and body modification. Despite the often graphic subjects of his works, critics have generally not considered Tagame's art as ero guro, or "erotic grotesque" art that focuses on material that is disgusting or horrific. Rather than depict gore and horror overtly, Tagame states that he draws inspiration for his BDSM stories from Shakespearean tragedy, German opera, and Japanese folktales that depict the "beauty of destruction" and a "person who’s falling apart". For example, in his manga Missing, a man frees his kidnapped brother by killing the corrupt military officers who have captured him, though the murderous act is intentionally not directly depicted.

Tagame's works focused on BDSM frequently depict a protagonist who goes through a process of self-discovery as a result of his participation in a BDSM or otherwise fetishistic relationship. Most often, these stories involve a masculine man whose engagement with BDSM transforms him from a dominant to a submissive sexual role, such as stories featuring "alpha" men who are sexually dominated and tortured or who allow themselves to be sexually debased out of a sense of responsibility or duty. Kolbeins argues that by depicting BDSM as a process of self-discovery, Tagame's stores are framed "within a relatable framework of human drama," while Kidd notes that "a typical Tagame character can be seen as the ultimate mature brute symbol of authority for whom the tide has abruptly turned." Examples of these themes include Endless Game, where a man taken as a sex slave comes to enjoy his new status and forces his captors to obey his desires, and Arena, where a Japanese karate champion becomes involved in an American fighting tournament where the winner of each match sodomizes the loser.

Japanese traditionalism
Tagame's works often depict Japanese historical settings, or draw heavily on traditional Japanese aesthetics in plot or subject material. While homosexuality has a history in Japan dating to ancient times, the country shifted away from a tolerance of homosexuality amid Westernization during the Meiji era (1868–1912), and forms of gay expression that were once accepted became pathologized and criminalized. This tension between traditionalism and modernism manifests in Tagame's erotic manga through his rendering of hierarchies, such as works that focus on the patriarchal nature of Japanese society, or samurai characters that serve as symbolic representations of an unjust feudal order. Tagame has stated that he is "fascinated by how these hierarchies fail," describing his simultaneous frustration and attraction to hierarchies associated with Japanese traditionalism thusly:

One of Tagame's earliest long-form serialized works was The Silver Flower, a historical drama set in the Edo period that follows a formerly wealthy businessman who is forced into sexual slavery in order to resolve a debt. Through the course of the abuse and humiliation he endures at the hands of his male clients, the character comes to realize that he is a masochist; Kolbeins notes that the series "examines a time when male-male sexuality flourished in Japanese society, unfettered by Western notions of sin and 'sodomy'." In Country Doctor, which focuses on a pre-modern Japanese village where western-imposed taboos on sex are absent, Tagame states that he seeks to "spin on its head is this idea that we think people were more conservative in the past and are more liberated in the present."

Themes of traditionalism similarly manifest in Tagame's all-ages manga, albeit in a non-sexual context, through their examination of contemporary Japanese social attitudes towards homosexuality. In My Brother's Husband, protagonist Yaichi is forced to examine his own preconceived notions about gay people after meeting the husband of his deceased twin brother, with his initial homophobia mirroring the prevalent conservative attitudes towards LGBT rights in Japan. Tagame notes that Yaichi's character arc towards tolerance and acceptance further mirrors themes in his BDSM manga, where characters are faced with a choice between acceptance of reality or the denial of their own desires and happiness.

Works

Manga
The following is a list of Tagame's serialized and one-shot manga works. Serializations refer to multi-chapter works that are typically later published as collected editions (tankōbon), while one-shots refer to single-chapter works that are sometimes later collected in anthologies.

, 1994, B Product; republished October 12, 2017, Pot Publishing
, 2001, G-Project; republished by Pot Publishing as:
The Silver Flower vol. 1 (October 27, 2012)
The Silver Flower vol. 2 (October 27, 2012)
The Silver Flower vol. 3 (October 27, 2012)
Pride, published by Furukawa Shobo as:
Pride vol. 1 (October 2004); also includes Trap (2003)
Pride vol. 2 (November 2004); also includes Trap 2 (2003)
Pride vol. 3 (December 2004); also includes The Gamefowl in Darkness (1995) and The Unpatriotic Boy (2004)
, published by Terra Publications as: 
The House of Brutes vol. 1 (November 30, 2006)
The House of Brutes vol. 2 (January 31, 2007)
The House of Brutes vol. 3 (March 31, 2007)
, published by Pot Publishing as: 
Do You Remember the South Island's POW Camp? vol. 1 (December 25, 2007)
Do You Remember the South Island's POW Camp? vol. 2 (December 25, 2007)
, published by Futabasha as: 
My Brother's Husband vol. 1 (May 25, 2015)
My Brother's Husband vol. 2 (January 1, 2016)
My Brother's Husband vol. 3 (October 12, 2016)
My Brother's Husband vol. 4 (July 12, 2017)
, published by Futabasha as: 
Our Colors vol. 1 (January 12, 2019)
Our Colors vol. 2 (October 11, 2019)
Our Colors vol. 3 (September 12, 2020)

, 1994, B Product; republished 2020 by Pot Publishing
Collects The Rasp (1990), The Construction Workers (1991), Purgatory (1991), The Legend of Hitotsuya (1992), My Teacher (1992), and The Judo Master Remix Version (1994)
, 1998, G-Project 
Collects The Mountain Cottage Training Camp (1991), The Yoke of Shadow (1991), The Legend of Shiramine (1991), The Echoes (1994), The Prisoners (1995), The Silent Shore (1996), and The After Story of The Mountain Cottage Training Camp (1998)
, 2005, Furukawa Shobo
Collects the Gunji tetralogy [Gunji (2002), The Scar (2003), The Rain Shower  (2003), and The Pit of Fire [2003)] and The Ballad of Ôeyama (2004)], The Sow's Heaven (2003), The Demon Who Lives in the Tower Keep (2004), The Hairy Oracle (2004), I Wanted to Say "I Love You" for the Whole (2004), and The Ballad of Oeyama (2004)
, 2007, Pot Publishing
Collects The Legend of Koromogawa (1992), The Soldier's Brave Blood (1999), The Yakuza's Brave Blood (2000), The Melon Thief (2000), The Arena (2000), Zenith (2000), Nightmare (2001), Kranke (2002), and The Tumble Doll MP (2004)
, October 12, 2007, Oakla Publishing
Collects Virtus (2005), I Can't Tell Anybody (2005), The Vast Snow Field (2007), and The Nonulcer Dyspepsia (2007)
, 2009, Ôkura Publishing
Collects The Masochist (2000), The Long Lonely Night (2007), The Nonulcer Dyspepsia (2007), Dissolve (2008) The Pillory (2008) The Protege (2008), Run, My Horse, Run! (2008), The Eclosion (2009), and The Moon Over the Rainy Sky (2009)
, 2010, Pot Publishing
Collects The Army of Fallen-Tears (2007), A Boy In Hell (2008), The Confession (2008) Father and Son in Hell (2009), and The Flying Dutchman (2009)
, 2012, Pot Publishing
Collects The Secret Affair of the 43rd Floor (1999), The Puppet Master (2008), The Gigolo (2008), Pochi, My Dog (2008), The Lover Boy (2009), Standing Ovations (2010), The Country Doctor (2010), and Enslaved in Unknown World (2012)
, 2012, OKS Publishing
Collects The Exorcism (2009), Hot Oden (2009), Company Slave Elegy (2010), Cretian Cow (2010), The Job Switch (2010), Missing (2010), Monster Hunt Show (2011), End Line (2012)
, 2013, Pot Publishing
Collects In the Chest (2010), The Winter Fisherman Lodge (2011), and Man-Cunt (2011)
, 2014, Pot Publishing
Collects Endless Game (2012) and Contracts of the Fall (2013)
, 2017, Pot Publishing
Collects Slave Training Summer Camp (2013) and On All Four on Friday Nights (2015)

The Passion of Gengoroh Tagame (2013, Picturebox)
Collects The Arena (2000), The Hairy Oracle (2004), The Exorcism (2009), The Country Doctor (2010), Missing (2010), Standing Ovations (2010), and Class Act (2013)
Massive: Gay Erotic Manga and the Men Who Make It (2014, Fantagraphics Books)
Multi-author anthology containing an excerpt of Do You Remember the South Island's POW Camp? (2001)
Endless Game (2013, Bruno Gmünder)
Collects Endless Game (2012)
Gunji (2014, Bruno Gmünder)
Collects the Gunji tetralogy [Gunji (2002), The Scar (2003), The Rain Shower  (2003), and The Pit of Fire [2003)] and The Ballad of Ôeyama (2004)
Fisherman’s Lodge (2014, Bruno Gmünder)
Collects The Confession (2008), The Winter Fisherman Lodge (2011), and End Line (2012)
The Contracts of the Fall (2015, Bruno Gmünder)
Collects Pochi, My Dog (2008), The Flying Dutchman (2009), The Lover Boy (2009), and The Contracts of the Fall (2013)
Khoz, The Spellbound Slave (2018, Bear’s Cave)
Collects Khoz, The Spellbound Slave (2016, eBook)
My Brother's Husband (Pantheon), published as:
My Brother's Husband vol. 1 (2017)
My Brother's Husband vol. 2 (2018)
My Brother's Husband omnibus (2020)
Our Colors (2022, Pantheon)
The Passion of Gengoroh Tagame, Vol. 2 (2022, Fantagraphics)
Collects Dissolve (2008), Manimal Chronicles (2009), Moon Shower (2009), Slave Training Summer Camp (2013), and King of the Sun (2018)

Art books and novels
Gay Erotic Art in Japan Vol. 1: Artists From the Time of the Birth of Gay Magazines (2003, Pot Publishing)
Gay Erotic Art in Japan Vol. 2: Transitions of Gay Fantasy in the Times (2006, Pot Publishing)
To the Future of Gay Culture (2017, P-Vine)
Gay Erotic Art in Japan Vol. 3: Growth of the Gay Magazines and the Diversification of their Artists (2018, Pot Publishing)
Gengoroh Tagame Sketchbook (2018, Massive Goods)

Reception and influence
Tagame is regarded as the most prolific and influential creator of gay manga. The manga anthology Massive: Gay Erotic Manga and the Men Who Make It notes Tagame as "without a doubt the individual most directly responsible for the success of gay manga," while Kidd has compared his oeuvre to that of the Marquis de Sade, Pier Paolo Pasolini, and Yukio Mishima.

Anthropologist Wim Lunsing credits the "bear-type" aesthetic pioneered by Tagame with provoking a major stylistic shift in Shinjuku Ni-chōme, the gay neighborhood of Tokyo. Following the publication of G-men, the "slender and slick" clean-shaven style popular among gay men was replaced with "stubble, beards and moustaches [...] extremely short became the most common hair style and the broad muscular body, soon to evolve to chubby and outright fat, became highly fashionable." Tagame's work in establishing G-men is further credited as providing an incubator for up-and-coming talent in the gay manga genre, and launching the careers of artists such as Jiraiya. His archival efforts in producing Gay Erotic Art in Japan are further credited with developing a "gay art canon" of Japanese erotic art. Among Tagame's critics are gay erotic artist Susumu Hirosegawa, who has described his art as "S&M theater" and criticized his manga as "simple emanations of the SM-shumiō [hobby] of Tagame." Lunsing concurs that "it is hard to counter [Hirosegawa's] argument, as [Tagame's] stories are not very elaborate."

Tagame has won multiple awards for his work, primarily My Brother's Husband. The series was awarded excellence awards at the 19th Japan Media Arts Festival in 2015 and the Japan Cartoonists Association Award in 2018. Internationally, the series won an Eisner Award for Best U.S. Edition of International Material—Asia in 2018. Works by Tagame were exhibited at the British Museum in 2019, as part of its exhibition on the history of manga.

Notes

References

Bibliography

External links
 
Official blog 
Former blog (in Japanese; defunct link via Internet Archive)

1964 births
Living people
People from Kamakura
Fetish artists
Manga artists
Pseudonymous artists
BDSM writers
Japanese gay writers
Japanese gay artists
Japanese erotica writers
Gay male BDSM
LGBT comics creators
Tama Art University alumni
Articles containing video clips
Artists from Kanagawa Prefecture
Japanese art historians
Gay male erotica artists
Hentai manga artists